Cesti can refer to:
Antonio Cesti (1623-1669), Italian Baroque composer
Italian plural of Cestus, a Classical weapon
 Latin plural of cestus (Cest), a girdle